Malahari is a Carnatic raga.  This raaga is a janya of the 15th Melakarta raga Mayamalavagowla. This raga is known to be a morning raga which brings out a sense of calmness. It is associated with the rainy season.

In classical carnatic training, it is often used as a raaga for beginners using geetha right after the swara-based exercises in Mayamalavagowla.  Many of the Geetha's in this raga have been composed by Purandara Dasa and Muthuswami Dikshitar.

Structure and Lakshana 

This raga is an asymmetric scale and is classified as an audava-shadava raga (five notes in the ascending scale and six notes in the descending scale).

: 
: 

The notes in this scale are shuddha rishabha, shuddha madhyama, shuddha dhaivata in arohana and additional antara gandhara in avarohana. Since this scale does not have a nishadha, it can be derived from Gayakapriya (13th melakarta) or Vakulabharanam (14th) too, but has been traditionally associated with Mayamalavagowla (15th) as the parent.

Select compositions

Geeta's 
shri GaNanaatha in Rupaka, written by Purandara Dasa
kunda gowra gowrivara in Rupaka, written by Purandara Dasa
padumanaabha paramapurusha in Triputa, written by Purandara Dasa
kereya neeranu kerege chelli in Triputa, written by Purandara Dasa

Kritis 
Panchamatanga in Rupaka composed by Muthuswami Dikshitar
Ananta Padmanaabam in Rupaka composed by Muthiah Bhagavatar
Kalaye Devadeva in Jhampa composed by MaharajaSwathi Thirunal
Melukovayya in Adi composed by Shahji Maharaja

Related rāga's 
This section covers the theoretical and scientific aspect of this rāga.

Scale similarities 
Karnataka Shuddha Saveri is a rāga which has a symmetrical scale matching the ascending scale of Malahari (gandhara is entirely omitted). Its  structure is S R1 M1 P D1 S : S D1 P M1 R1 S

Notes

References

Janya ragas